The Glamorganshire Canal local nature reserve is a nature reserve in Whitchurch, Cardiff, Wales. Formed in 1967, it comprises a disused section of the Glamorganshire Canal (constructed 1794), the Long Wood (designated as a Site of Special Scientific Interest) and an area of the flood plain of the River Taff. The reserve is also known as Forest Farm, and the old farm buildings are used to support the reserve.

The water in the canal is relatively clean for an ex-industrial area, and supports several species of waterbirds, including kingfishers and herons. It is one of the few British nest sites of the Eurasian bittern. The Long Wood is chiefly oak and beech, with several trees over 200 years old.

The reserve is supported by the Friends of Forest Farm, who organise educational events and support Cardiff Council in the protection and maintenance of the nature reserve.

See also
List of Sites of Special Scientific Interest in Mid & South Glamorgan

References

Parks in Cardiff
Country parks in Wales
Sites of Special Scientific Interest in Cardiff
Nature reserves in Cardiff